La Salle-les-Alpes (Occitan: La Sala los Aups or simply La Sala) is a commune in the Hautes-Alpes department in the Provence-Alpes-Côte d'Azur region in Southeastern France. In 2018, it had a population of 959.

Geography
The commune of La Salle-les-Alpes forms part of the Serre Chevalier ski resort in the Valley of the Guisane alongside Briançon, Saint-Chaffrey and Le Monêtier-les-Bains. It encompasses the villages and hamlets of La Salle, Villeneuve, Le Bez, Les Pananches and Moulin-Baron. As it is situated on the 45th parallel north, it is equidistant of the North Pole and Equator.

Demographics

See also
Communes of the Hautes-Alpes department

References

Communes of Hautes-Alpes
Hautes-Alpes communes articles needing translation from French Wikipedia